Langenæs Parish is a parish in the Diocese of Aarhus in Aarhus Municipality, Denmark. The parish is occupied by the neighborhood of Langenæs.

References 

Aarhus Municipality
Parishes of Denmark